Samuel Billingsley Hill (April 2, 1875 – March 16, 1958), was a lawyer, mayor, and U.S. congressman from eastern Washington.

Born in Franklin, Arkansas, Hill attended the common schools, the University of Arkansas at Fayetteville, and was graduated from its law department in 1898. While at the University of Arkansas, he was a member of Xi Chapter of the Kappa Sigma Fraternity.

Hill was admitted to the bar the same year and commenced practice in Danville, Arkansas.  While living in Danville, the young Hill served as Mayor  and was also Chairman of the Democratic Central Committee of Yell County, Arkansas. It was in Danville where Hill also began his pursuit of development of rural areas.  In 1899, Hill, J.E. Wooten, and John McCarthy established the Danville Turnpike Company.

He moved west to Waterville in eastern Washington in 1904 and continued the practice of law.
Hill served as prosecuting attorney of Douglas County 1907–1911, and served as judge of the superior court for Douglas and Grant Counties 1917–1924.

Hill was elected as a Democrat to the Sixty-eighth Congress to fill the vacancy caused by the resignation of J. Stanley Webster. During his time in the House of Representatives, Hill advocated for the funding of the Grand Coulee Dam.  He was called the "Political Father of the Grand Coulee Project" by the Wenatchee Dispatch.

He was reelected to the Sixty-ninth and to the five succeeding Congresses and served from September 25, 1923, until his resignation, effective June 25, 1936, having been confirmed as a member of the United States Board of Tax Appeals (now the United States Tax Court) on May 21, 1936, serving as a judge on the court until his retirement November 30, 1953.
He died in Bethesda, Maryland, March 16, 1958.
He was interred in Rock Creek Cemetery, Washington, D.C.

References

Sources

External links
 

1875 births
1958 deaths
Arkansas state court judges
Judges of the United States Tax Court
United States Article I federal judges appointed by Franklin D. Roosevelt
20th-century American judges
Democratic Party members of the United States House of Representatives from Washington (state)
University of Arkansas School of Law alumni
Members of the United States Board of Tax Appeals
People from Waterville, Washington
People from Izard County, Arkansas
Burials at Rock Creek Cemetery